Finnairin Palloilijat, or FinnPa as the club is more commonly known as, was a Finnish association football club established in 1965. The club was based in Helsinki and it operated from 1965 to 1998.
FinnPa was founded by staff of the Finnish national airline Aero as "Aeron Pallo". When the company changed its name to Finnair, the club was also renamed Finnairin Palloilijat (Ball players of Finnair).

In 1976 the club's men's team was promoted to the Second Division, the third highest level of football in Finland. It remained at the three highest levels for the rest of the club's existence with the absolute peak being the club's promotion to the Premier Division in 1993. In 1997 the club finished at third place in the league table.

1998 became the club's last season of existence when FinnPa was relegated to the First Division after losing to Tampereen Pallo-Veikot in the relegation playoffs. Finnair wasn't willing to support the club financially anymore, so it folded.

FinnPa played a total of six seasons at the highest level of football in Finland.

Season to season 

6 seasons in Veikkausliiga
11 seasons in Ykkönen
10 seasons in Kakkonen
3 season in Kolmonen
3 season in Nelonen

References

External links
 FinnPa at 90minut.pl

 
Defunct football clubs in Finland
Association football clubs established in 1965
Association football clubs disestablished in 1998
1965 establishments in Finland
1998 disestablishments in Finland
Football clubs in Helsinki
Finnair